The 2015 Shimadzu All Japan Indoor Tennis Championships was a professional tennis tournament played on carpet. It was the 19th edition of the tournament which was part of the 2015 ATP Challenger Tour. It took place in Kyoto, Japan between 23 February and 1 March.

ATP singles main draw entrants

Seeds

 1 Rankings are as of February 16, 2015.

Other entrants
The following players received wildcards into the singles main draw:
  Hiroyasu Ehara
  Issei Okamura
  Takashi Saito
  Takao Suzuki

The following players received entry into the main draw using a protected ranking:
  Karunuday Singh

The following players received entry from the qualifying draw:
  Yūichi Ito
  Kim Cheong-Eui
  Hiroki Kondo
  Arata Onozawa

Champions

Singles

 Michał Przysiężny def.  John Millman, 6–3, 3–6, 6–3

Doubles

  Benjamin Mitchell /  Jordan Thompson def.  Go Soeda /  Yasutaka Uchiyama, 6–3, 6–2

External links
Official Website

Shimadzu All Japan Indoor Tennis Championships
All Japan Indoor Tennis Championships
Shimadzu All Japan Indoor Tennis Championships